Joseph Armando Espaillat II (born December 27, 1976) is a Dominican-American prelate of the Catholic Church who has been serving as an auxiliary bishop for the Archdiocese of New York since 2022.

Biography

Early life 
Joseph Espaillat was born on December 27, 1976, in New York City, the son of José and Mercedes Baez. His parents had emigrated to Manhattan from the Dominican Republic; the USCCB's African-American secretariat has described him as being of partial African descent. Espaillat attended Cathedral Preparatory School and Seminary in Queens and earned a Bachelor of Arts in philosophy at Fordham University in New York City in 1998.

Priesthood 
On May 17, 2003, Espaillat was ordained to the priesthood by Cardinal Edward Egan for the Archdiocese of New York. After his ordination, he was assigned to a pastoral position at Our Lady of Martyrs Parish in Washington Heights in Manhattan.  In 2007, Espaillat became parochial vicar, then administrator of St. Peter's Parish in Yonkers, New York; he was named pastor there in 2009. In 2012, he was appointed as director of youth ministry for the archdiocese.  Espaillat was named in 2015 as pastor of St. Anthony of Padua Catholic Parish in Bronx, New York, a position he still holds.

Auxiliary Bishop of New York 
Pope Francis appointed Espaillat as an auxiliary bishop for the Archdiocese of New York on January 25, 2022. Espaillat was consecrated as a bishop by Cardinal Timothy Dolan on March 1, 2022. At age 45, Espaillat became the youngest Catholic bishop in the United States and one of the youngest in the world.

See also

 Catholic Church hierarchy
 Catholic Church in the United States
 Historical list of the Catholic bishops of the United States
 List of Catholic bishops of the United States
 Lists of patriarchs, archbishops, and bishops

References

External links
Roman Catholic Archdiocese of New York Official Site

Episcopal succession

 

1976 births
Living people
Fordham University alumni
American Roman Catholic priests
Bishops appointed by Pope Francis

Dominican American
Dominican-American culture in New York (state)
American people of Dominican Republic descent
Afro-Latino culture in the United States
Latin American people of African descent
Afro-Dominican (Dominican Republic)